Sepia pardex is a species of cuttlefish native to the western Pacific Ocean, specifically off Japan, along the Pacific coast from the Chiba Peninsula, and along the Japan Sea coast from Toyama Bay to South Korea. It is also present off Taiwan and in the East China Sea. The depth range of this species is unknown.

Sepia pardex grows to a mantle length of 230 mm.

The type specimen was collected off Kajiyama, Chiba Prefecture, Japan. It is deposited at the University Museum of the University of Tokyo.

References

External links

Cuttlefish
Molluscs described in 1913